Ambiky is a municipality in Madagascar. It belongs to the district of Belo sur Tsiribihina, which is a part of Menabe Region. The population of the commune was estimated to be approximately 2,000 in 2001 commune census.

Only primary schooling is available. The majority 65% of the population of the commune are farmers, while an additional 34% receives their livelihood from raising livestock. The most important crop is rice, while other important products are cassava and sweet potatoes.  Services provide employment for 1% of the population.

History
This town was captured by the French troops from Sakalava defenders in the end of August 1897 during the Franco-Hova Wars. The Sakalava king, Itoera was killed with both of his generals and many of his nobles.

References and notes 

Populated places in Menabe